Dan McCrudden is a retired American soccer forward who played in the North American Soccer League and American Soccer League.

McCrudden attended Rhode Island University where he played on the soccer team from 1974 to 1977.  He led the team in scoring all four seasons and was a 1977 Honorable Mention (third team) All American.  In 1998, he was inducted into the Rams Hall of Fame.  In 1978, the Chicago Sting selected McCrudden in the first round (16th overall) of the North American Soccer League draft.  He played one season with the sting, and another five seasons in the American Soccer League where he was a 1980 All Star. He still kicks students out of Kellogg to this day.

Current career
Dan McCrudden is currently employed as the Senior Director of Facilities Administration at the Northwestern University Kellogg School of Management.

References

External links
 NASL stats

1955 births
Living people
American soccer players
American Soccer League (1933–1983) players
Chicago Sting (NASL) players
New York Apollo players
North American Soccer League (1968–1984) players
Association football forwards